The 2002 Conference USA men's soccer tournament was the eighth edition of the Conference USA Men's Soccer Tournament. The tournament decided the Conference USA champion and guaranteed representative into the 2002 NCAA Division I Men's Soccer Championship. The tournament was hosted by Saint Louis University and the games were played at Hermann Stadium.

Bracket

Awards

All-Tournament team
Tim Brown, Cincinnati
Brandon Dobbs, Cincinnati
Wiremu Patrick, Cincinnati
Matt Neely, Louisville
Brad Sokolowski, Louisville
Steve Lawrence, Marquette
Mike Robards, Marquette
Jason Cole, Saint Louis
Andy Pusateri, Saint Louis
Nick Walls, Saint Louis
Kevin Wickart, Saint Louis

References

External links
 

Conference USA Men's Soccer Tournament
Tournament
Conference USA Men's Soccer Tournament
Conference USA Men's Soccer Tournament